The 101st United States Congress began on January 3, 1989. There were 11 new senators (five Democrats, six Republicans) and 31 new representatives (16 Democrats, 15 Republicans), as well as one new delegate (a Democrat) at the start of the first session. Additionally, two senators (one Democrat, one Republican) and 12 representatives (nine Democrats, three Republicans) took office on various dates in order to fill vacancies during the 101st Congress before it ended on January 3, 1991.

Senate

Took office January 3, 1989

Took office during the 101st Congress

House of Representatives

Took office January 3, 1989

Non-voting delegates

Took office during the 101st Congress

See also 
 List of United States senators in the 101st Congress
 List of members of the United States House of Representatives in the 101st Congress by seniority

Notes

References 

101st United States Congress
101